Hesse-Rheinfels was created as a cadet line of Hesse for Philip II, Landgrave of Hesse-Rheinfels (1541–1583), landgrave from 1567 until 1583, and as a cadet line of Hesse-Kassel for Ernest, Landgrave of Hesse-Rheinfels (1623–1693), landgrave from 1627 until 1658.

First creation

Philip was the third son of Philip the Magnanimous, Landgrave of Hesse and Christine of Saxony (1505–1549). After his father's death in 1567, the Landgraviate of Hesse was divided between the four sons of his first marriage. Philip the younger received a portion of about an eighth of his father's territories, mainly the former Lower County of Katzenelnbogen with its four Ämter Rheinfels (with the city of St. Goar and the residence Rheinfels Castle) on the left bank of the Rhine, and Braubach, Reichenberg and Hohenstein on the right bank.

Second creation

Maurice the Learned (1572–1632) was Landgrave of Hesse-Kassel from 1592 until 1627. Maurice turned to Calvinism in 1605, became involved later in the Thirty Years' War, and, after being forced to cede some of his territories to the Darmstadt line, abdicated in 1627 favour of his son William V (1602-1637), his younger sons receiving apanages which created several cadet lines of the house (Hesse-Rotenburg, Hesse-Eschwege and Hesse-Rheinfels), of which, with amalgamation, that of Hesse-Rheinfels-Rotenburg survived till 1834.

In 1627 Ernest (1623–1693), a younger son of Maurice, Landgrave of Hesse-Kassel, received Rheinfels and lower Katzenelnbogen as his inheritance, and some years later, on the deaths of two of his brothers, Friedrich, Landgrave of Hesse-Eschwege (1617–1655) and Herman, Landgrave of Hesse-Rotenburg (1607–1658), he added Eschwege, Rotenburg, Wanfried and other districts to his possessions.

List of landgraves
First creation
Philip II, Landgrave of Hesse-Rheinfels (1541–1583), landgrave 1567–1583

Second creation
Ernest, Landgrave of Hesse-Rheinfels 1627–1658, Landgrave of Hesse-Rheinfels-Rotenburg 1658–1693.

Notes

References

Further reading

Rheinfels
Hesse-Rheinfels
Early Modern history of Germany
1567 establishments in the Holy Roman Empire